Jan Zahradil (born 30 March 1963) is a Czech politician for the Civic Democratic Party (ODS) who has been Member of the European Parliament (MEP) since the Czech Republic entered the European Union in 2004. Zahradil also served as Member of the Chamber of Deputies (MP) from 1998 to 2004.

A scientific researcher by profession, Zahradil entered politics during the Velvet Revolution.  He was a member of the Federal Assembly of the Czech and Slovak Federative Republic,
before becoming an adviser to Prime Minister Václav Klaus.  In 1998, he was elected to the national Chamber of Deputies.  Three years later, he became Vice-Chairman of the ODS.  Following an unsuccessful attempt to become Chairman in 2002, he was appointed First Vice-Chairman. From his election to the Chamber of Deputies until 2006 he was the ODS shadow minister for Foreign Affairs.

He was appointed an MEP on the Czech Republic's accession to the EU, in May 2004, and was elected at the top of the ODS's list at the June 2004 election.  He was elected head of the Civic Democrats' delegation in the European Parliament, in which capacity he led the negotiations that founded the European Conservatives and Reformists.  He was re-elected in 2009 and became Vice-Chairman of the newly founded ECR.  In March 2011, Zahradil was elected Chairman, replacing Michał Kamiński.  He also sits on the Parliament's Committee on Development.

Background

Early life
Zahradil was educated at the Institute of Chemical Technology in Prague, and after graduating in 1987, he became a scientific researcher until 1992. He speaks Czech, Slovak, English, Russian, German and Polish. He is married and has two children.

Domestic politics
From 1990 until 1992, Zahradil was a Member of the Federal Assembly of the Czech and Slovak Federative Republic. From 1995 until 1997 Zahradil was a foreign policy adviser to the Prime Minister, Václav Klaus. In 1998, Zahradil was elected as a Member of the Chamber of Deputies of the Czech Republic and held that position until 2004.

In 2001, he was elected a Vice-Chairman of the ODS, and between 2002 and 2004, was the First Vice-Chairman.

European Parliament
In 2004, he was elected a Member of the European Parliament and was the Chairman of the ODS in the European Parliament. Between 2004 and 2009, ODS MEPs sat with the EPP-ED grouping in the European Parliament, but after the 2009 elections, several members of the EPP-ED left to join the newly formed European Conservatives and Reformists (ECR) grouping, which was based on the Movement for European Reform, an alliance between ODS and the British Conservative Party.  In his capacity as Chairman of ODS in the European Parliament, Zahradil reportedly led negotiations in forming the new group which after the European elections in 2014 become the third largest group in the European Parliament.

He was elected Vice Chairman of the ECR, sitting on the group's Executive.  In March 2011, he was elected to replace Michał Kamiński as chairman of the group, defeating Timothy Kirkhope by 33 votes to 18.

After his re-election in 2014 he was elected Vice-Chairman of the European Parliament's Committee on International Trade.

In October 2018, he announced his intention to become the European Conservatives and Reformists Group's candidate for the European Commission presidency. He was endorsed by the ECR Group on 13 November 2018, making him the first Spitzenkandidat from Eastern Europe.

Since the Alliance of Conservatives and Reformists in Europe (ACRE) was founded in 2010 Jan Zahradil has been its president.

Azerbaijan Statements
Jan Zahradil made controversial statements whitewashing European Parliament's criticisms on the state of human rights in Azerbaijan, mentioned in three European Parliament resolutions in the period of 2015–2018.  He called the resolutions "short-sighted, one-sided, one-issue resolutions" and argued that Azerbaijan is a "victim of political games" asserting that the EU should not sacrifice its partnership with Azerbaijan because of its geopolitical and energy significance for Europe.

In April 2018 a Parliamentary Assembly of Council of Europe investigation revealed that Azerbaijan blindfolded several members of PACE, bringing into play the infamous caviar diplomacy to tone down and soothe criticism towards Azerbaijan. These members were subjected to sanctions. Commenting on these events, Zahradil said: "The Council of Europe has made unilateral and biased decisions on Azerbaijan and it should be abolished".

Political views
Viewed as being an ideological protégé of former Czech President Václav Klaus, Jan Zahradil is a two track European Union reform advocate and economic liberal. As chairman of the EU trade commission he has overseen several bilateral trade agreements, most notably the FTA between Vietnam and the EU. He has been described as Anglophile, Atlanticist, national liberal and libertarian, and holds liberal viewpoints on immigration and gay marriage.

See also

 Movement for European Reform
 European Conservatives and Reformists
 Alliance of European Conservatives and Reformists

References

External links

 Jan Zahradil website
 
 

1963 births
Living people
Civic Democratic Party (Czech Republic) MEPs
MEPs for the Czech Republic 2004–2009
MEPs for the Czech Republic 2009–2014
MEPs for the Czech Republic 2014–2019
Young Conservatives (Czech Republic) politicians
Politicians from Prague
MEPs for the Czech Republic 2019–2024
University of Chemistry and Technology, Prague alumni